This is a list of commercial banks in Madagascar.

 AccèsBanque Madagascar (ABM)
 Bank of Africa (BOA)
 Banque Industrielle et Commerciale de Madagascar (BICM)
 Banque Malgache de L’ocean Indien (BMOI)
 Banque Nationale d'Investissement (BNI)
 BGFI Bank Madagascar (BGFI)
 BFV-Société Générale (BFV-SG)
 Madagascar Microfinance Bank
 Mauritius Commercial Bank (MCB)
 State Bank of Mauritius (SBM)
 SIPEM Banque (SIPEM)

External links
 Website of Central Bank of Madagascar (French)

See also
 List of banks in Africa
 Central Bank of Madagascar
 Economy of Madagascar

References

 
Banks
Madagascar
Madagscar